This was the first edition of the tournament.

Irina Bara and Maryna Zanevska won the title, defeating Akgul Amanmuradova and Elena Bogdan in the final, 3–6, 6–2, [10–8].

Seeds

Draw

Draw

References
Main Draw

Kiskút Open - Doubles